Joseph F. Jarrard is a United States Army major general who served as the Deputy Commanding General for Army National Guard of the United States Army Europe and Africa from April 1, 2019 to March 25, 2022. Previously, he served as the Adjutant General of the Georgia National Guard.

Raised in Gainesville, Georgia, Jarrard graduated from North Georgia College with a Bachelor of Business Administration degree in accounting in 1988. He later earned a Master of Education degree from North Georgia College and a Master of Strategic Studies degree from the United States Army War College. His twin brother James Jarrard is also an army lieutenant general.

References

Year of birth missing (living people)
Living people
Place of birth missing (living people)
People from Gainesville, Georgia
Military personnel from Georgia (U.S. state)
University of North Georgia alumni
United States Army War College alumni
Recipients of the Meritorious Service Medal (United States)
Recipients of the Legion of Merit
United States Army generals
Recipients of the Distinguished Service Medal (US Army)